The London mayoral election for the office of Mayor of London takes place every four years. The first election was held in May 2000, and five subsequent elections have taken place. The latest mayoral election took place in 2021, it was initially going to be held in 2020 but was postponed a year due to the COVID-19 pandemic.

Electoral system
The electoral system used for London mayor elections is first-past-the-post, where voters cast their vote for a candidate of their choice and the candidate who receives the most votes wins.

Prior to the Elections Act 2022, elections were held using the supplementary vote system, where voters express a first and second choice of candidate, if no candidate receives an absolute majority of first choice votes, all but the two leading candidates are eliminated, and the votes of those eliminated redistributed according to their second choice votes to determine the winner.

As with most elected posts in the United Kingdom, a candidate must pay a deposit to run in the election. The current deposit a candidate must pay is £10,000, which is returned if the candidate's wins at least 5% of the first preference votes cast. The winner is elected for a fixed term of four years, there are no restrictions on the number of terms a Mayor may serve. Elections take place in May.

Results

Elections in the 2020s

2021

Incumbent Labour mayor Sadiq Khan won re-election against Conservative candidate Shaun Bailey.

Elections in the 2010s

2016

The 2016 London mayoral election was held on 5 May 2016. The results were announced on 7 May at 00:30, despite British television news channel Sky News announcing Sadiq Khan as the winner hours earlier.

The incumbent mayor, Boris Johnson, did not run for re election for a third term in office, as he was elected the Member of Parliament for Uxbridge and South Ruislip in the 2015 General Election.

2012

The Conservative mayor Boris Johnson was elected to a second term in office, defeating former Labour mayor Ken Livingstone. Livingstone announced his retirement from politics in his concession speech.

Elections in the 2000s

2008

The incumbent Labour mayor, Ken Livingstone was defeated by Conservative candidate Boris Johnson, who became London's second mayor.

2004

In June 2004, the second election was held. After being re-admitted to the Labour Party, Ken Livingstone was their official candidate. He won re-election after second preference votes were counted, with Steven Norris again coming second.

2000

The 2000 campaign was incident filled. The eventual winner, Ken Livingstone, reneged on an earlier pledge not to run as an independent, after losing the Labour nomination to Frank Dobson. The Conservative Party candidate, Jeffrey Archer, was replaced by Steven Norris after Archer was charged with perjury.

See also
Elections in the United Kingdom

References

External links
 http://www.londonelects.org.uk, official website